The Electrical and Electronics Engineering Institute (formerly Department of Electrical and Electronics Engineering) of the University of the Philippines College of Engineering (UP EEEI) offers three undergraduate programs of study leading to the Bachelor of Science in Electrical Engineering (BSEE), Bachelor of Science in Electronics and Communications Engineering (BSECE), and Bachelor of Science in Computer Engineering (BSCoE) degrees. The Institute also offers graduate programs of study leading to the Master of Science in Electrical Engineering (MSEE) and Master of Engineering in Electrical Engineering (MEEE) degrees, and the Doctor of Engineering (DE) and Doctor of Philosophy (PhD) degrees in Electrical and Electronics Engineering. Various areas of specialization are offered in the graduate programs: Electric Power Engineering, Computer and Communications Engineering, Microelectronics, and Instrumentation and Control.

The undergraduate program in Electrical Engineering is designed to train students in the analysis, planning, design, operation, instrumentation, and control of power systems and associated electrical machines, equipment, and devices. The undergraduate program in Electronics and Communications Engineering prepares students for the evaluation, planning, design, and operation of electronic devices, circuits, and instruments, and of communication equipment and systems. The undergraduate program in Computer Engineering is aimed at training students in the design, implementation, and application of computer hardware and software in modern computer systems.

The undergraduate programs in Electrical Engineering, Electronics and Communications Engineering, and Computer Engineering provide a strong background in science, mathematics, and engineering fundamentals with emphasis on the development of analytical and creative abilities. This enables the graduate to achieve success in a wide range of careers. The curricula are designed to prepare students for leadership in the developmental roles that Electrical Engineering, Electronics and Communications Engineering, and Computer Engineering play in the Philippines and in other countries. The student is trained to be an independent and innovative thinker with a solid foundation in the fundamentals. Problem-solving skills and design capability are developed in order to solve both closed-ended and open-ended problems. In the classroom, stress is placed on the integration of basic principles and the application of methods of analysis to electrical and electronic processes and systems. On the other hand, laboratory work is performed to expose students to the equipment and techniques used in scientific investigation and engineering practice. In their project activities, students meet the need for engineering judgment, teamwork, and careful planning. They develop their abilities to observe and make decisions based on independent and creative thought. Students are also provided with schooling in professional attributes like communication skills, the art of self-learning, ethics, and the essentials of quality management. To keep the student well informed of important current and likely future technology, new knowledge and emerging technologies are continuously being integrated into the undergraduate programs.

The graduate programs in Electrical and Electronics Engineering provide advanced training in any of the areas of specialization offered by the Institute. Their aim is to provide the country with a pool of highly qualified electrical and electronics engineers who are able to carry out creative and challenging work in research, development, high-level design, industry, university teaching, and government, and who are capable of using existing and emerging technologies in solving today’s problems.

Laboratories

The Institute has a number of facilities with a substantial collection of instruments, equipment, and computers for instruction and research in the different areas of Electrical and Electronics Engineering. These facilities include the following laboratories:

Research Laboratories
Artesyn Power Electronics Laboratory (ASTEC PEL)
Wireless Communications Engineering Laboratory (WCEL)
Computer Networks Laboratory (CNL)
Digital Signal Processing Laboratory (DSP)
Electric Power Research Laboratory (EPRL)
Instrumentation, Robotics, & Control Laboratory (IRC)
Analog Devices Microelectronics & Intel Microprocessors Laboratory (MicroLab)
Mobile Robotics Laboratory (Mobot)
Solar Photovoltaics Laboratory
Power Systems Simulation Laboratory (PSSL)
Ubiquitous Computing Laboratory (UCL)
Robotics and Automation Laboratory (RAL)
Smart Grid Research Center (SGRC)

Instructional Laboratories

Alexan Laboratory (A-Lab)
Basic Electronics Laboratory (B-Lab)
Communications Electronics & Embedded Systems Lab (CEESL)
Electronics Machines Instructional Laboratory (EML)
Artesyn Power Electronics Instructional Laboratory
Power Systems Simulation Instructional Laboratory
Robotics Automation Instructional Laboratory
Electronics Lab (E-Lab)
Electronics Prototyping Laboratory (EPL)
Network Simulation and Training Laboratory (NSTL)
Power Systems Simulator Laboratory (PSSL)
SAL Training Center (STC)
Electric Power Instructional Laboratory

Student organizations
IEEE
Institute of Integrated Electrical Engineers
Institute of Electronics Engineers of the Philippines University of the Philippines Student Chapter
UP Circuit
UP Engineering Radio Guild
UP SAVER

External links

Official Web sites

UP EEEI official website
UP Diliman official website
University of the Philippines official website

UP Diliman College of Engineering